ISCD refer to:

As an initialism, acronym, or symbol:
 Industry Sorting Code Directory
 Independent Scientific Committee on Drugs (UK drug advisory body), now rebranded DrugScience
 Israel Sports Center for the Disabled
 International Society for Clinical Densitometry
 International Symposion on Chiral Discrimination
 International Shipping Centre Development